Stanley Jason Rapert (born April 3, 1972) is an American politician from the state of Arkansas, who served as a member of the Arkansas State Senate from 2011 to 2023 and represented the 35th district.

Political career

Rapert was elected in 2010 to the Arkansas State Senate, representing the 18th district. As a result of decennial redistricting, he sought reelection in the 35th district in 2012, when he defeated Democrat Linda Tyler. In the general election held on November 4, 2014, Rapert won a four-year term in the state Senate by defeating Democrat Joel Pearson, 13,483 votes to 10,267.

Reproductive rights

Rapert believes in banning abortion even for victims of rape and incest, as well as banning exceptions for the health of the mother.

Rapert authored a bill to ban all abortions in Arkansas after twelve weeks of pregnancy. Then-Governor Mike Beebe (D) vetoed the bill as unconstitutional, but "the Republican-led Legislature overrode his veto." In 2013, a federal judge stopped the law from being implemented, saying it was likely unconstitutional. In January 2016, the U.S. Supreme Court denied the State's petition for a writ of certiorari to review the case. The State of Arkansas was ordered to pay over $97,000 in attorneys' fees and costs to the prevailing plaintiffs before the Supreme Court decision was finalized.

Minorities
At a 2011 Tea Party rally, Rapert said, "we're not going to allow minorities to run roughshod over what you people believe in".  Rapert later claimed that his remarks about minorities were taken out of context. The "minority" comments Rapert made in 2011 referenced both Barack Obama and a ballot initiative (Arkansas Proposed Initiative Act No. 1 (2008)) stricken as unconstitutional that prohibited unmarried cohabitating couples from adopting. The Arkansas act had been criticized for prohibiting gay couples from adopting.

On June 30, 2015, the Jason Rapert for Arkansas Senate Facebook page announced, in response to a post suggesting that the rights of minorities are not subject to majority wishes, that "we the majority grant you rights by choice." Later on that same day, the  Facebook page accused Max Brantley and the Arkansas Times as a whole, of reporting that Rapert does not "recognize God has endowed us with natural rights that are given by God that no man can take away."

LGBT issues
While running for the Arkansas General Assembly, Rapert stated: "Traditional marriage in our society has always been between one man and one woman. I support an amendment to the U.S. Constitution that protects that right now and forevermore." As a member of the Arkansas Legislative Council, a powerful committee in the Arkansas General Assembly, Rapert proposed a non-binding resolution to "urge the Arkansas Supreme Court to overturn a circuit judge’s ruling striking down Arkansas’ same-sex marriage ban." Rapert initially proposed impeaching the judge who issued the ruling, but later stated he wanted to establish a system of judicial recall.

On June 7, 2015, Rapert took to Facebook to "urge everyone to contact the Conway City Council and Mayor Tab Townsell in opposition to allowing activists to march through the streets of Conway on a Sunday to mock Christian values and accuse Christians of being bigots", in protest of the Conway Gay Pride Parade that was scheduled to take place later that same day, which he deemed an anti-Christian activity. According to The Chicago Sun-Times, responses to the Facebook post were "largely mocking".

Following the U.S. Supreme Court's ruling in Obergefell v. Hodges that legalized gay marriage, Rapert claimed that the Court's ruling was unconstitutional. Rapert encouraged public officials "to refuse to comply with an unjust ruling that violates religious freedom and states rights".

Medical marijuana 
In November 2016, Arkansas became the first state in the Bible Belt to legalize medical marijuana, passing by nearly 70,000 votes. Rapert publicly opposed the ballot, and both introduced legislation to ban the consumption of medical marijuana in smoking form, and  sponsored legislation to delay the program as long as federal laws banning marijuana remain on the books. When pointed out to him during an interview that it can easily be considered hypocrisy that he would oppose medical marijuana in favor of federal law, while opposing marriage equality in spite of federal law, he responded with "Watch your language with me or we'll stop the interview".

Ten Commandments monuments 
Rapert has pushed for the installation of the privately funded Ten Commandments Monument on the Arkansas state capitol grounds. Rapert sponsored a bill in 2015 which would require the secretary of state to allow for the installation of the monument. The monument was challenged by the ACLU as being a violation of clauses in both the federal and state constitutions prohibiting the government from favoring any religion. The first version of the monument was installed in 2017, and was destroyed less than 24 hours later.

Legal challenges were suspended until a replacement monument could be installed. The new version, with protective concrete bollards, was unveiled April 27, 2018. The monument was again challenged by the ACLU, the Arkansas Society of Freethinkers, and The Satanic Temple. The Satanic Temple had successfully challenged a similar monument in Oklahoma in 2015, and in both locations has offered to install a bronze monument to Baphomet as a symbol of religious pluralism and freedom.

U.S. military power
In February 2015, Rapert stated that the United States should use nuclear weapons in response to the threat posed by the Islamic State of Iraq and the Levant. The post sparked a "lively debate...rang[ing] from agreement to ridicule" on social media: Wonkette replied sarcastically to this stance, as did Daily Kos, and Esquire.

Social media

In early September 2015, after having been approached by a local constituent at a store, Rapert posted a tweet that read, "Not smart to come up and harass somebody in a parking lot who's carrying a handgun. Better be glad you decided to walk away #armed&ready", which became the center of a controversy on social media. Rapert said that the tweet was not referring to the incident with that constituent. On October 2, 2018, the group American Atheists filed a lawsuit against Rapert, claiming he violated constituents' First and Fourteenth Amendment rights by blocking them on social media platforms and stifling debate.

In February 2019, the sludge metal band Eyehategod posted a Facebook event for a show booked in Little Rock that used a picture of Rapert eating a baby, and Rapert spoke out, calling for a protest of the venue and the band, saying "I call on Vinos in Little Rock to cancel this event and apologize for such a disrespectful image that shows the dehumanization of babies lives. It is disrespectful of all who value babies lives and people of faith" and urged the band to find the "love, grace and mercy of God and choose to update their name to 'EyeloveGod'" in a later update to his post.

Personal life
Rapert was raised near the rural community of Supply on a small family farm. He attended school in Maynard in Randolph County and was active in basketball and academics.

In 1990, Rapert married Laurie Ellen Tyler of Pocahontas in 
Randolph County and a member of the Jarrett Tribe Family. The couple moved to Conway, where they both attended the University of Central Arkansas, where he majored in Political Science and Sociology. He worked for United Parcel Service while attending college.

Rapert and his wife have two daughters. He plays the fiddle, which he learned by ear when he was ten years old.

Rapert is the founder and president of Holy Ghost Ministries, and he makes annual missionary visits to Ghana.

On July 23, 2020, Rapert was hospitalized with pneumonia due to COVID-19.

Rapert is a member of the conservative American Legislative Exchange Council (ALEC), the Gideons International, and Rotary International.

References

External links
Official page at the Arkansas General Assembly website
Campaign site
 

1972 births
Living people
Republican Party Arkansas state senators
American Christians
Place of birth missing (living people)
University of Central Arkansas alumni
People from Randolph County, Arkansas
People from Perry County, Arkansas
21st-century American politicians